The 2022–23 season is the 123rd in the history of S.S. Lazio and their 35th consecutive season in the top flight. The club are participating in Serie A, the Coppa Italia, the UEFA Europa League, and the UEFA Europa Conference League.

Players

Transfers

In

Out

Pre-season and friendlies

Competitions

Overall record

Serie A

League table

Results summary

Results by round

Matches 
The league fixtures were announced on 24 June 2022.

Coppa Italia

UEFA Europa League

Group stage

The draw for the group stage was held on 26 August 2022.

UEFA Europa Conference League

Knockout phase

Knockout round play-offs
The knockout round play-offs draw was held on 7 November 2022.

Round of 16
The round of 16 draw was held on 24 February 2023.

Statistics

Appearances and goals

|-
! colspan=14 style="background:#B2FFFF; text-align:center"| Goalkeepers

|-
! colspan=14 style="background:#B2FFFF; text-align:center"| Defenders

|-
! colspan=14 style="background:#B2FFFF; text-align:center"| Midfielders

|-
! colspan=14 style="background:#B2FFFF; text-align:center"| Forwards

|-
! colspan=14 style="background:#B2FFFF; text-align:center"| Players transferred out during the season

References

S.S. Lazio seasons
Lazio
Lazio